Suzhou–Jiaxing railway is a former railway line in China between Suzhou and Jiaxing. The line has a total length of 74.44 kilometres.

History
Due to the failure in January 28 Incident, the government of Republic of China had to accept the demilitarization of Shanghai and needed a new railway to the west of it.

The construction of this railway began on February 22, 1935 and finished on July 15 of the same year.

In 1944, Japanese invaders demolished the railway to get resources.

See also
Nantong–Ningbo high-speed railway, a proposed new railway which will connect Suzhou and Jiaxing

References

Railway lines in China
Rail transport in Jiangsu
Rail transport in Zhejiang
Transport in Suzhou
History of Suzhou
Jiaxing